Zella may refer to:

Places
 Zella, Libya
 Zella (see), a Roman Catholic titular see in the Roman province of Byzacena (in modern Tunisia)
 Zella-Mehlis, a German town
 Zella/Rhön, a German municipality
 Altzella Abbey, a former monastery near Nossen, Germany
 Neuzelle a German municipality

People
 Zella Day (born 1995), American singer
 Zella Allen Dixson (1858 – 1924), American author, lecturer, librarian, and publisher
 Zella Lehr (born 1951), an American singer and entertainer
Zella McBerty (1879–1937), American businesswoman and engineer
 Zella de Milhau (1870–1954), American artist, ambulance driver, community organizer and motorcycle policewoman
 Zella Jackson Price (born c. 1940), American gospel singer
 Zella Russell (1883–1952), American vaudevillian star
 Zella Wolofsky (born 1947), Canadian modern dancer, researcher, columnist, and educator

See also
 Altzellen, a community within Wolfenschiessen, Germany
 Zela (disambiguation)